Horse Camp is a property on Mount Shasta owned by the nonprofit Sierra Club Foundation. It is a  enclave within the Mount Shasta Wilderness of the Shasta-Trinity National Forest in California, United States. It is located at approximately  elevation at the lower end of Avalanche Gulch, the most popular climbing route on the mountain.

The most notable feature of Horse Camp is the Shasta Alpine Lodge, a climber's hut constructed in 1923.  Mostly indigenous materials were used for construction, including volcanic rock and Shasta red fir. The lodge can be used for emergency shelter for climbers. It contains a guest register, a library of mountain books, and displays about Mount Shasta. 

Other features of Horse Camp include a freshwater spring, low impact campsites, and a solar-powered composting toilet facility.

A caretaker is on duty during the summer months. The first caretaker (1923–1934) was Joseph Macatee "Mac" Olberman (1862–1946). With the help of volunteers, Olberman built a 950 yard long flagstone paved path leading uphill from Horse Camp to facilitate access to the Avalanche Gulch climbing route. This structure still exists and is known as Olberman's Causeway.

The camp and the lodge are open year-round, even when no caretaker is on duty.  

Horse Camp is utilized as a mountaineering base camp for ascents of Mount Shasta by Avalanche Gulch, Casaval Ridge, the West Face Gully and other routes on the south and west side of the mountain.

References 

Mount Shasta
Sierra Club
Mountain huts in the United States
Buildings and structures in Siskiyou County, California
Campgrounds in California
Tourist attractions in Siskiyou County, California
Rustic architecture in California
1923 establishments in California